HMS Antrim was a  destroyer of the British Royal Navy launched on 19 October 1967. In the Falklands War, she was the flagship for the recovery of South Georgia, participating in the first ever anti-submarine operation successfully conducted exclusively by helicopters.
In 1984, she was commissioned into the Chilean Navy, and renamed Almirante Cochrane.

Background
Antrim first commissioned in 1970 and served her first commission in home and Mediterranean waters. In the mid-1970s, the Royal Navy removed 'B' turret and replaced it with four Exocet missile launchers to give her a greater anti-ship capability.
After installation of the Exocet missiles it was found that the missile could be activated by small arms fire, so armoured plates were fitted to the outer sides of the missiles containers.

Operational history
In 1976 her commission included a visit to Stockholm, where she represented the Royal Navy at the wedding of the King of Sweden.

Falklands War
In 1982 she formed part of the Royal Navy task force for service in the Falklands War.

Antrim was the flagship of Operation Paraquet, the recovery of South Georgia in April 1982, where she took part in a 400-shell bombardment.
Her helicopter, a Westland Wessex HAS.Mk3, was responsible for the rescue of 16 SAS men from Fortuna Glacier, and the crew of two previous rescue helicopters that had crashed. The aircraft played a key role in the detection and disabling of the Argentinian submarine . This was the first ever anti-submarine operation successfully conducted exclusively by helicopters.
Captain Lagos, commander of the Argentine forces on South Georgia, signed the surrender document for the Argentine forces there in her wardroom. Lieutenant-Commander Alfredo Astiz signed a separate document shortly afterwards aboard .

While supporting the main landing at San Carlos Water, 12 bombs narrowly missed, but a  bomb penetrated Antrim. It did not explode or kill anyone, and it took 10 hours to remove. Antrim fired her Sea Slug missile system at an Argentine Air Force Douglas A-4 Skyhawk without hitting it.

A name board formerly belonging to her now resides in the Falkland Islands Museum, Stanley.
[[File:XP142 Humphrey.jpg|thumb|left|Antrim'''s Wessex helicopter XP142 Humphrey]]

Chilean NavyAntrim was decommissioned in 1984 and sold to Chile on 22 June 1984. The Chileans renamed her Almirante Cochrane after Thomas Cochrane, who had commanded the Chilean Navy from 1817 to 1822. In 1994, Almirante Cochrane underwent the same refit as her sister ship Blanco Encalada (HMS Fife). This entailed removing her Sea Slug launcher and extending her deck aft to allow the installation of a new, larger hangar. In 1996 she received the Barak SAM in place of her Seacat launchers.

The Chilean Navy decommissioned Almirante Cochrane on 7 December 2006. On 11 December 2010, she was towed to China for scrap.

Affiliates as HMS Antrim
Royal Irish Rangers
As part of her relationship with County Antrim, she carried a piece of the Giant's Causeway mounted in the ship's main passageway, appropriately also named the Giant's Causeway.

Commanding officers
Notable commanding officers include D A Loram 1971-1973 and B G Young 1981-1983.

Notes

Sources
 
 McCart, Neil, 2014. County Class Guided Missile Destroyers, Maritime Books. 
 Yates, D. (2006) Bomb Alley – Falklands War 1982: Aboard HMS Antrim at War'', Pen & Sword Maritime, 
 Parry, Chris (2012) "Down South: a Falklands War Diary" Viking Penguin

External links
HMS Antrim Association

 

County-class destroyers of the Royal Navy
Ships built in Govan
1967 ships
Cold War destroyers of the United Kingdom
Falklands War naval ships of the United Kingdom
Falklands War in South Georgia
County-class destroyers of the Chilean Navy